Jamalabad-e Kuseh (also Romanized as Jamālābād-e Kūseh) is a village in Kalashtar Rural District, in the Central District of Rudbar County, Gilan Province, Iran. At the 2006 census, its population was 519, in 135 families.

References 

Populated places in Rudbar County